Introspective is the third studio album by English synth-pop duo Pet Shop Boys, released on 10 October 1988 by Parlophone. It received generally positive reviews from critics.

Background
The album was unusual in that it reversed the typical process by which pop/dance acts released singles. Instead of releasing an album of regular-length (3–5-minute) songs, then releasing lengthy remixes of those songs on subsequent singles, Introspective was released as an LP consisting of songs that all lasted six minutes or more. Tracks released as singles like "Always on My Mind" and "Domino Dancing" had been issued as shorter, more radio-friendly mixes prior to the album. None was released as a radio single in the same form as it appeared on the album. It was also the case for the two other singles "Left to My Own Devices" and "It's Alright". 

Of the six tracks on the album, only two were written specifically for the album—"Left to My Own Devices" and "Domino Dancing". "Always on My Mind" and "It's Alright" are cover versions, "I Want a Dog" is a song that previously appeared as B-side of the single "Rent", and "I'm Not Scared" is their own version of a song they had written for Patsy Kensit's pop group Eighth Wonder. "Always on My Mind" was re-recorded for this album and mixed with "In My House", a new acid-house track on the album which expanded the lyric.

Introspective was re-released in 2001 (as were the duo's first six albums) as Introspective/Further Listening 1988–1989. The re-released version was digitally remastered and came with a second disc of B-sides and previously unreleased material from around the time of the album's original release. Yet another re-release followed on 9 February 2009, under the title Introspective: Remastered. This version contains only the six tracks on the original. With the 2009 re-release, the 2001 two-disc re-release was discontinued. On 2 March 2018, the two-disc version of the album was re-released, this time featuring newly remastered versions of the tracks. It was also released as a digital download and on vinyl.

Neil Tennant, in a speech he gave to the Oxford Union, said he regretted releasing Introspective so soon after Actually as he felt the 12-inch nature of the songs may have put some fans off the band and this probably impacted on the sales of Behaviour, the subsequent album critically regarded as the Pet Shop Boys' finest album but commercially one of their least successful. Nevertheless, Introspective remains, according to Tennant, the best-selling Pet Shop Boys album internationally. It peaked at number two on the UK Albums Chart, behind U2's Rattle and Hum.

Track listing

Notes
  Only Sterling Void is credited as a songwriter on original pressings of Introspective and the "It's Alright" single. Starting in 2001, Pet Shop Boys releases featuring "It's Alright" also credit Marshall Jefferson and Paris Brightledge for songwriting.
  signifies an additional producer
  signifies an associate producer

Personnel
Credits adapted from the liner notes of Introspective.

Pet Shop Boys
 Neil Tennant
 Chris Lowe

Additional musicians
 Richard Niles – orchestra arrangement and conducting 
 Sally Bradshaw – additional vocals 
 Josh Milan – piano solo 
 Fro Sossa – additional keyboards 
 Mike Bakst – additional keyboards, brass score 
 Nestor Gomez – guitar 
 Tony Concepción – brass, trumpet solo 
 Kenneth William Faulk, Dana Tebor, Ed Calle – brass 
 Lewis A. Martineé – brass arrangements 
 The Voice in Fashion – backing vocals 
 Blue Weaver – Fairlight programming 
 Andy Richards, Gary Maughan – Fairlight programming 
 Judy Bennett, Sharon Blackwell, H. Robert Carr, Mario Friendo, Derek Green, Michael Hoyte, Herbie Joseph, Paul Lee, Gee Morris, Dee Ricketts, Iris Sutherland, Yvonne White – additional vocals

Technical
 Trevor Horn – production 
 Stephen Lipson – production, engineering 
 Pet Shop Boys – production ; associate production 
 David Jacob – engineering ; production 
 Mike Nielsen – engineering 
 Frankie Knuckles – mix, additional production 
 John Poppo – mix engineering 
 Lewis A. Martineé – production, engineering, mixing 
 Mike Couzzi – engineering 
 César Sogbe – engineering assistance 
 Julian Mendelsohn – production, engineering

Artwork
 Mark Farrow – cover design
 Pet Shop Boys – cover design
 Eric Watson – photography

Charts

Weekly charts

Year-end charts

Certifications and sales

References

1988 albums
Albums produced by Stephen Lipson
Albums produced by Trevor Horn
Parlophone albums
Pet Shop Boys albums